Atlas: An Opera in Three Parts is a full-length recording of Meredith Monk's 1991 opera Atlas. It is the ninth album by Monk and was released in June, 1993 through ECM New Series.

Track listing

Personnel 
Musicians
Carlos Arévalo – vocals
Thomas Bogdan – vocals
Victoria Boomsma – vocals
Janis Brenner – vocals
Kathleen Carroll – viola
Shi-Zheng Chen – vocals
John Cipolla – bass clarinet
Allison Easter – vocals
Robert Een – vocals
Diana Emerson – vocals
Dina Emerson – vocals
Emily Eyre – vocals
Emily K. Eyre – vocals
Arthur J. Jr. Fiacco – cello
Katie Geissinger – vocals
Ching Gonzalez – vocals
Dana Hanchard – vocals
Wayne Hankin – conductor, shawm, sheng, vocals
Bill Hayes – glass harmonica
Wendy Hill – vocals
Susan Iadone – violin
Stephen Kalm – vocals
Darryl Kubian – violin
Steve Lockwood – orchestration, keyboards
David Meschter – sampler
Meredith Monk – vocals, cello
Bobby Osborne – vocals
Robert Osborne – vocals
Wilbur Pauley – vocals
Anthony Pirollo – cello
Cynthia Powell – keyboards
Thad Wheeler – percussion
James F. Wilson – French horn
Randall K. Wong – vocals
Production
Carol Bokuniewicz – design
Jim Caldwell – photography
Manfred Eicher – production
James Farber – engineering
Jan Erik Kongshaug – engineering
Peter Moore – photography
Larry Watson – photography

References 

1993 albums
Albums produced by Manfred Eicher
ECM New Series albums
Meredith Monk albums
Opera recordings